George Matthews Harding (1882–1959) was an American painter, author-illustrator, and a muralist. He served as an official war artist during World War I and World War II.

Life and career
George Matthews Harding was born in Philadelphia. At first, he studied architecture at Boston Tech. His final choice of careers was influenced by his older sister Charlotte Harding, who had studied art at the Philadelphia School of Design for Women at the Pennsylvania Academy of the Fine Arts with Howard Pyle. Charlotte encouraged him to attend the Pennsylvania Academy of the Fine Arts. He attended the academy at night and worked as an architect during the day. Following an introduction by his sister, Harding, like some other future AEF artists, studied for a time with Howard Pyle.

Harding's first illustrations appeared in the Saturday Evening Post in 1903, and in 1906 he became an illustrator and author for Harper's Monthly Magazine. While with Harper's he traveled extensively throughout the United States and the world. In 1915 he joined the faculty of the University of Pennsylvania as an associate professor in the department of fine arts, a post he held until 1935. He married Anita Cotheal Nisbett of Ardmore on June 5, 1916, and they had two children. Until 1917, he continued his international travels writing and illustrating articles for the Saturday Evening Post and Harper's Magazine.

When the United States entered World War I, he was chosen as one of eight combat artists attached to the American Expeditionary Forces in France. He began his artistic service as a member of the poster section of the U.S. Navy Publicity Bureau, and from there he was selected for the Army's Art program. Much of the work he produced during the war reflects his attempts to satisfy critics in Washington who wanted to see more action scenes.

After World War I, Harding returned to his painting and teaching in Philadelphia, publishing a limited-edition portfolio of some of his war art entitled The American Expeditionary Forces in Action, and established his own studio and home in Wynnewood, Pennsylvania. While Harding produced his first mural for the Traymore Hotel in Atlantic City, New Jersey in 1915, he gained much wider reputation as a muralist in the interwar period. He created murals for Post Office Department in Washington, D.C., post offices in Philadelphia and Wilkes-Barre, Pennsylvania, among others.

In 1942, at age 60, he accepted a commission with the U.S. Marine Corps as a combat artist in its campaigns in the Pacific during World War II. This time, he served as a captain in the U.S. Marine Corps.

His work was included in a few major group shows including "American Battle Painting 1776-1918" in 1944 and "Marines Under Fire" in 1943. Both were at New York's MOMA. In 1957 the Pennsylvania Academy of the Fine Arts would have a retrospective exhibition of his work. In February 1959, his work was part of a three-man show at Lehigh University with Schilli Maier and Benton Spruance hosted by Professor Francis Quirk.

After the war, he produced a series of murals for the Montgomery County Courthouse in Norristown, Pennsylvania.

He died in 1959 after suffering a stroke a year before.

Recognition
In 1940, Harding was elected into the National Academy of Design as an Associate member, and became a full Academician in 1945. He was also elected to the Society of Mural Painters. He was the only AEF artist who served in both world wars.

See also
 United States Army Art Program

References

External links

 Works by George Matthews Harding at the National Museum of American History
 

United States Army artists
1882 births
1959 deaths
Artists from Philadelphia
Pennsylvania Academy of the Fine Arts alumni
University of Pennsylvania faculty
World War I artists